The 1908 United States presidential election in Colorado took place on November 3, 1908, as part of the 1908 United States presidential election. Voters chose five representatives, or electors, to the Electoral College, who voted for president and vice president.

Background
The 1908 Democratic National Convention was held in Denver between July 7 and 10.

Vote
The Bryan/Kern ticket carried the state of Colorado on election day.

Bryan had previously won Colorado against William McKinley in both 1896 and 1900.

Until 2016, this was the last presidential election where a Democrat carried Colorado without winning the presidency, and remains the last time that the state had backed a Democrat who lost the popular vote.

Results

Results by county

Notes

References

Colorado
1908
1908 Colorado elections